Decalin (decahydronaphthalene, also known as bicyclo[4.4.0]decane and sometimes decaline), a bicyclic organic compound, is an industrial solvent. A colorless liquid with an aromatic odor, it is used as a solvent for many resins or fuel additives.

Isomers 
Decalin occurs in cis and trans forms. The trans form is energetically more stable because of fewer steric interactions. cis-Decalin is a chiral molecule without a chiral center; it has a two-fold rotational symmetry axis, but no reflective symmetry. However, the chirality is canceled through a chair-flipping process that turns the molecule into its mirror image.

trans-Decalin 
The only possible way to join the two six-membered rings in the trans position means the second ring needs to start from two equatorial bonds (blue) of the first ring. A six-membered ring does not offer sufficient space to start out on an axial position (upwards), and reach the axial position of the neighboring carbon atom, which then will be on the downwards side of the molecule (see the model of cyclohexane in figure 5). The structure is conformationally frozen. It does not have the ability to undergo a chair flip as in the cis isomer. In biology this fixation is widely used in the steroid skeleton to construct molecules (such as figure 6) that play a key role in the signalling between distantly separated cells.

Reactions
Oxygenation of decalin give the tertiary hydroperoxide, which rearranges to cyclodecenone, a precursor to sebacic acid.

Decalin is the saturated analog of naphthalene and can be prepared from it by hydrogenation in the presence of a catalyst. This interconversion has been considered in the context of hydrogen storage.

Occurrence
Decalin itself is rare in nature but several decalin derivatives are known.  They arise via terpene-derived precursors or polyketides.

Safety
Decalin easily forms explosive hydroperoxides upon storage in the presence of air.

See also 
 Perfluorodecalin
 Tetralin
 Dialin
 Naphthalene

References

Hydrocarbon solvents
 
Bicycloalkanes